Manduriano is a dialect of the Salentino, spoken by the majority of the inhabitants of Manduria, in southern Apulia.

Vocabulary and expressions 
„Quannu lu ciucciu no mboli nci bei, ti macari cu fišchi. Ital.: Se l'asino non vuole bere, puoi fischiare quanto credi.”„Erva ca no buei ntra lu uertu ti nasci. Ital.: L'erba che non vuoi nell'orto ti nasce.”„Quannu lu sorgi no arria allu casu, tici ca puzza. Ital.: quando il topo non arriva al formaggio dice che puzza.”„La jaddina faci lu ueu e lu jaddu canta. Ital.: La gallina fa l'uovo e il gallo canta.”„Lu mboi chiama curnutu lu ciucciu. Ital.: Il bue chiama cornuto l'asino.”

Extreme Southern Italian dialects
Languages of Italy

References